Michael McAdoo (born July 9, 1990) is an American former professional football player who was a defensive end in the National Football League (NFL) and Canadian Football League (CFL). He played college football for the North Carolina Tar Heels. He was signed by the Baltimore Ravens as an undrafted free agent in 2011.

Early years
McAdoo attended Antioch High School in Antioch, Tennessee. He was selected to the all-state, all-area and all-district team after collecting 36 tackles including 13 sacks and 12 tackles for a loss in his junior season at high school. He was a finalist for Class 5A Mr. Football Lineman in his Senior year in high school.

He was an all-state performer for the high school basketball team in his junior year. He was ranked the No. 13 prospect in the state of Tennessee by SuperPrep.  He was ranked among the top 50 defensive ends in the state of Tennessee by Scout.com.

College career
McAdoo accepted a football scholarship to play defensive end at the University of North Carolina at Chapel Hill for the Tar Heels. In 2011, the NCAA declared him permanently ineligible for academic misconduct.

In July 2011, he filed a lawsuit against the NCAA and North Carolina, but the court denied his request to be reinstated for his senior season. He was mostly a backup player that finished with 3½ sacks in his two seasons.

Professional career

Baltimore Ravens
On August 23, after the conclusion of the 2011 NFL Supplemental Draft, he was signed by the Baltimore Ravens as an undrafted free agent. On June 1, 2012, he tore his Achilles tendon in OTA's forcing him to miss the entire season. He was released on June 5, 2013, after the signing of Daryl Smith.

Winnipeg Blue Bombers
On October 10, 2013, he signed with the Winnipeg Blue Bombers of the Canadian Football League.

Arizona Rattlers
McAdoo finished the 2015 season with 29 tackles, 11 sacks, and 2 forced fumbles.

Dallas Cowboys
On December 30, 2015, he was signed by the Dallas Cowboys to the practice squad.

On January 4, 2016, he was re-signed to a reserve/future contract. On September 3, he was waived/injured by the Cowboys and was placed on the injured reserve list. On September 13, he was released with an injury settlement.

Hamilton Tiger-cats
On August 7, 2017, the Hamilton Tiger-cats (CFL) signed McAdoo to their practice roster.

Saskatchewan Roughriders 
He was traded on August 18 to the Saskatchewan Roughriders (CFL) along with a 6th round draft pick in 2018 in exchange for wide receiver Ricky Collins Jr. and a seventh round pick in the 2018 CFL draft. He was released on August 25, 2017.

References

External links

Baltimore Ravens bio
North Carolina Tar Heels bio

1990 births
Living people
Players of American football from Tennessee
American football linebackers
American football defensive ends
North Carolina Tar Heels football players
Baltimore Ravens players
Winnipeg Blue Bombers players
People from Antioch, Tennessee
Arizona Rattlers players
Hamilton Tiger-Cats players
Saskatchewan Roughriders players